Rabbit Hero is a 2015 Chinese animated science fiction comedy film directed by Fu Yan. It was released in China on May 30, 2015.

Voice cast
Liu Hongyun
Li Xuqiao
Bai Wenxian
Shen Ke
Song Lei
Zhou Yan
Li Sixian
Zhang Zikun
Li Taichen
Dong Yuxin

Box office
The film earned  at the Chinese box office.

References

2015 films
2015 comedy films
2015 animated films
2010s science fiction comedy films
Chinese animated science fiction films
Animated comedy films
Animated films about rabbits and hares
2010s Mandarin-language films